Gnamptonyx innexa is a species of moth in the family Erebidae first described by Francis Walker in 1858. The species is found from Morocco to the Arabian Peninsula, Israel, Iran, Afghanistan, Pakistan and western India.

There are multiple generations per year. Adults are on wing in February, June and October in Israel.

The larvae probably feed on Acacia species.

External links

Image

Ophiusini
Moths of Cape Verde
Moths of Africa
Moths of the Middle East
Moths described in 1858